China Power Clean Energy Development (CPNED), formerly China Power New Energy Development Company Limited (CPNE) and Oriental Investment, is a Chinese renewable energy company established in 2006 and listed on the Hong Kong Stock Exchange. It operates hydropower, wind, natural gas, solar, and waste-to-energy power plants.

History
In 2011 CPNED became the first renewable energy company in China to succeed raising substantial hard currency funding via a bond issue.

In 2010, the company acquired China Power Dafeng Wind Power Company for US$74 million. In 2012, the company agreed to acquire a Chinese wind turbine unit of Suzlon Energy for US$60 million.  However, this deal was terminated.

In 2015, the company announced that it will take over State Nuclear Power Technology Corporation.  More precisely, China Power New Energy Development signed a MoU to acquire by issuing new shares to SNPTC and/or another SPIC's subsidiary China Power New Energy Limited. and SNPTC to sell their nuclear power assets and businesses.

Ownership
China Power Investment Corporation (now known as State Power Investment Corporation) was the majority owner of the company via intermediate holding companies.

In December 2011, China Three Gorges Corporation paid HK$2.1 billion (US$270 million) for a 29% stake in CPNED to become the largest shareholder of the company that time.

Corporate leadership
The chairman till December 2015 was Li Xiaolin, then also chairman and CEO of China Power International Development and vice general manager of China Power Investment Corporation.  She became the chairman of the company in May 2007, replacing Lai Leong in this position. In December 2015, she was replaced by Wang Binghua, chairman of State Power Investment Corporation (ex-China Power Investment Corporation)

Projects
In May 2011 CPINE (the overseas arm of CPNED) signed a cooperation framework with First Solar of Arizona to work on photovoltaic projects in China and the U.S., with a plan to match First Solar's installed capacity in America in China.

By 30 June 2016, the company had installed power generation capacity of 3,650.1 MW, including 1,429.5 MW of wind, 1,300 MW of natural gas, 595.8 MW of hydropower, 228.2 MW of photovoltaic, and 78 MW of waste-to-energy generation facilities. in addition, 842.75 MW of capacities were under construction.

In 2015 the first three completed projects of the Group commenced operation:
No. 6 Gansu Anbei Wind Power Project with capacity of 46.5 MW, 
Hainan, Changjiang - Photovoltaic Power Project with capacity of 20.0MW and 
Yunnan, Yuanjiang - Photovoltaic Power Project with capacity of 20.0 MW,  with installed capacity of 86.5MW in total.

Four more projects were completed in the first quarter of 2016: 
Two generation unitsat Phase II of Guangdong Dongguan Natural Gas Power Project with capacity of 470.0MW each 
No. 3 Unit  at Phase II of Hainan Haikou Waste-to-energy Power Project with capacity of 12.0MW
Phase III of Gansu Baiyin Photovoltaic Power Project with capacity of 15.0MW 
Gansu Guazhou - Photovoltaic Power Project with capacity of 8.0MW

Footnotes

References

External links

Companies listed on the Hong Kong Stock Exchange
Renewable energy companies of China
Electric power companies of Hong Kong
2006 establishments in China